1915 is an Australian historical drama television miniseries written by Peter Yeldham, based on Roger McDonald's 1979 novel 1915: A Novel of Gallipoli, that premiered on ABC TV on 27 June 1982, and concluded on 8 August 1982. The miniseries stars Scott McGregor, Scott Burgess, Sigrid Thornton, Jackie Woodburne, Ilona Rodgers, Richard Moir, Serge Lazareff, Damon Sanders, and Andrew McFarlane. It deals the friendship between two young mates during the outbreak of World War I.

Cast

 Scott Burgess – Billy Mackenzie
 Scott McGregor – Walter Gilchrist
 Lorraine Bayly – Helen Gilchrist
 Gary Holmes – Douggie Gilchrist
 Bill Hunter – Alan Gilchrist
 Jackie Woodburne – Dianna Bendetto
 Arna-Maria Winchester – Brigid Scott
 Sigrid Thornton – Frances Reilly
 Anne Haddy – Mrs. Gillen
 Andrew McFarlane – Robert Gillen
 Gerard Kennedy – Dent
 Serge Lazareff – Blackly Reid
 Richard Moir – Reverend Fox
 Maurie Fields – Mayor
 Ilona Rodgers – Mrs. Reilly
 Martin Vaughan – Hugh Mackenzie
 Vince Martin – Frank Barton
 Adrian Wright – Oliver Melrose
 Ric Herbert – Pig Nolan
 Mervyn Drake – Lt. Fagan

Awards and nominations

References

External links
 
 1915 at Australian Screen Online

1982 Australian television series debuts
1982 Australian television series endings
1980s Australian drama television series
1980s Australian television miniseries
Australian Broadcasting Corporation original programming
Australian military television series
English-language television shows
Historical television series
Television series about families
Television shows based on Australian novels
Works about friendship
Works about the Gallipoli campaign
World War I television drama series